Ardisia nigrovirens is a species of plant in the family Primulaceae. It is endemic to Peru.

References

nigrovirens
Endemic flora of Peru
Near threatened flora of South America
Taxonomy articles created by Polbot